The Gene Illusion is a 2003 book by clinical psychologist Jay Joseph, in which the author challenges the evidence underlying genetic theories in psychiatry and psychology. Focusing primarily on twin and adoption studies, he attempts to debunk the methodologies used to establish genetic contributions to schizophrenia, criminal behaviour, and IQ. In the nature and nurture debate on the causes of mental disorders, Joseph's criticisms of genetic research in psychiatry have found their place among those who argue that the environment is overwhelmingly the cause of these disorders, particularly with psychiatry critic Jonathan Leo, and with Oliver James. It was also reviewed favorably in Choice and the British Journal of Learning Disabilities. Some of the conclusions of The Gene Illusion have been criticized in reviews of the book.

See also 
 Anti-psychiatry
 Attention-deficit hyperactivity disorder controversies 
 Biological psychiatry
 Biopsychiatry controversy
 Causes of schizophrenia
 Inheritance of intelligence
 Mad in America

References

External links 
 Jay Joseph's Web site

2003 non-fiction books
Anti-psychiatry books
Biology of bipolar disorder
English-language books
Genetics books
Books about schizophrenia